STE20-related kinase adapter protein beta is an enzyme that in humans is encoded by the STRADB gene.

This gene encodes a protein that belongs to the serine/threonine protein kinase STE20 subfamily. One of the active site residues in the protein kinase domain of this protein is altered, and it is thus a pseudokinase. This protein is a component of a complex involved in the activation of serine/threonine kinase 11, a master kinase that regulates cell polarity and energy-generating metabolism. This complex regulates the relocation of this kinase from the nucleus to the cytoplasm, and it is essential for G1 cell cycle arrest mediated by this kinase. The protein encoded by this gene can also interact with the X chromosome-linked inhibitor of apoptosis protein, and this interaction enhances the anti-apoptotic activity of this protein via the JNK1 signal transduction pathway. Two pseudogenes, located on chromosomes 1 and 7, have been found for this gene.

Interactions 

ALS2CR2 has been shown to interact with XIAP.

References

External links

Further reading